Gochenée is a village in Wallonia and a district of the municipality of Doische, located in the province of Namur, Belgium.

The village church dates from the 18th century. The former village school is from 1854.

References

External links

Populated places in Namur (province)